Boronia muelleri, commonly known as the forest boronia or pink boronia,  is a flowering plant that occurs in forest, woodland and heath in Victoria and New South Wales in Australia. It is an erect, woody shrub or small tree with pinnate leaves and up to fifteen pink to white four-petalled flowers arranged in leaf axils in spring and summer.

Description

Taxonomy and naming
Forest boronia was first formally described in 1863 by George Bentham who gave it the name Boronia pinnata var. muelleri and published the description in Flora Australiensis. The description was based on specimens collected near the sources of the Bunyip River in the Grampians, near Portland Bay, and towards the mouth of the Glenelg River by Ferdinand von Mueller. In 1924, Edwin Cheel raised the variety to species status as Boronia muelleri. The specific epithet (muelleri) honours Ferdinand von Mueller.

Distribution and habitat
Boronia muelleri usually grows in moist sandy soil in forest, woodland and heath. It is found in New South Wales south from Eden to Buchan in eastern Victoria with disjunct populations near Labertouche and Chapple Vale.

References 

muelleri
Flora of New South Wales
Flora of Victoria (Australia)
Plants described in 1863
Taxa named by George Bentham